Ahmed Falah (Dhivehi: އަޙްމަދު ފަލާޙް; born 1975) is a Maldivian singer, musician, film director, screenwriter/ scriptwriter, song writer, lyricist and poet. He won the Best Director Award in 2011 for Fageeru Koe in Maldives Film Awards 2011. He won the Best Melodition in 2008 in "Miadhu Crystal Awards 2008". He also won first place at the Maldivian Icon in 2009.

Filmography

Discography

As A Singer

Feature Film

Short Film

Non-Film Songs

As A Lyricist

Feature Film

Short Film

Non-Film Songs

Awards 

 2009: Maldivian Icon as a Singer

References 

1975 births
Living people
People from Malé
Maldivian musicians